The Kansas City Royals' 2013 season was the 45th for the Royals franchise which began on April 1, 2013 against the Chicago White Sox.

After a winning record in spring training (setting a team and MLB record), the Royals remained over .500 nearly most of April during regular season play. The team also didn't commit an error in their first seven games (for 64 2/3 innings) for the first time in team history. On September 22, the Royals won their 82nd game of the season, to clinch their 2nd winning season since 1994 and first since 2003.

Offseason and spring training

During the offseason, the Kansas City Royals donated over $4 million in funds raised during the 2012 All-Star game for various projects in the Kansas City area communities, including building two baseball facilities for disabled children.

Alex Gordon signed a $37.5 million four-year deal last season with the Royals. The team lost Eric Hosmer to the United States team for the World Baseball Classic.

Right-handed pitcher Zack Greinke, who won the 2009 AL Cy Young Award while with Kansas City, signed a $147 million six-year contract to join the Los Angeles Dodgers in the offseason but was slow during spring training with a sore elbow and the flu.

Jeremy Guthrie signed a $25 million three-year deal in November 2012 to stay with the Royals after being their best starter during the year. Guthrie will be the Royals' No. 3 starter. Former AL MVP, Miguel Tejada, made the team as a utility player with a $1.1 million one-year contract.

During spring training in Surprise, Arizona, the Royals had the best record of any team and maintained first place throughout every game. They not only tied and then exceeded a franchise record (previously set 22 wins and 9 losses in 1999), but also had more spring training wins than any other team in MLB history.

The Royals were the only team losing less than 10 games other than the Baltimore Orioles (9 losses), ending spring training with a 25–7–2 record. Kansas City lost their first spring training game after 11 wins in a row, the only unbeaten team in spring training at that point.

Kansas City manager Ned Yost said "The key to our success this year is going to be our pitching staff, because we can catch the ball. If they're throwing strikes, we're going to be able to make plays and I think we're going to be able to score runs." Yost added, "It just gives you confidence going into the season knowing that everybody's ready, everybody's playing well."

The Royals left Arizona (Surprise Stadium) without any players having any serious injuries. This was in contrast to March 2012 when closer Joakim Soria needed season-ending Tommy John surgery and starting catcher Salvador Pérez required knee surgery which sidelined him until late June 2012.

Kansas City led the majors in team batting average, hits, doubles, runs scored and on-base percentage, clinching first place in the Cactus League standings. The Royals finished with a Cactus League-leading .335 batting average and 230 runs.

After improving their starting rotation, the Royals were considered a "sleeper team" entering the 2013 season. The Royals appeared poised to challenge the AL champion Detroit Tigers in the AL Central. Overall, the Royals increased their chances that they would contend in 2013.

According to Foxs Sports, for the first time in more than two decades the Kansas City Royals may become relevant again. Other projections predicted the Royals to finish in second, third or even fourth place in the American League Central.

"There's a lot to like about this team", Royals manager Ned Yost said. "I think we've got a great defense. I think our starting pitching is going to be a focal point and a strong asset to our club. Our relief pitching has always been dynamite in my mind."

Transactions

Signings

•Major League: Jeremy Guthrie, SP: three years, $25MM.

•Minor League: Blaine Boyer, Chad Tracy, Endy Chávez, Miguel Tejada, Xavier Nady, Willy Taveras, George Sherrill, Dan Wheeler, Brandon Wood and Anthony Ortega.

Trades and Claims

•Acquired SP James Shields, P Wade Davis and IF Elliot Johnson from the Tampa Bay Rays for OF Wil Myers, P Mike Montgomery, 3B Patrick Leonard and P Jake Odorizzi.

•Acquired P Luis Rico  and P Luis Santos from the Pittsburgh Pirates for P Vin Mazzaro and 1B Clint Robinson.

•Acquired SP Ervin Santana from the Los Angeles Angels for P Brandon Sisk.

•Claimed C George Kottaras off waivers from the Oakland Athletics.

•Claimed P Guillermo Moscoso off waivers from the Colorado Rockies.

•Claimed C Brett Hayes off waivers from the Miami Marlins.

•Claimed P Chris Volstad off waivers from the Chicago Cubs.

Notable Losses

•Wil Myers, Vin Mazzaro, Joakim Soria, Mike Montgomery, Brandon Sisk and Patrick Leonard.

Season highlights

April
In April, Jeremy Guthrie had the longest undefeated streak by a Royals pitcher over 13 starts since Kevin Appier in 1994-95.

On April 5, Alex Gordon and Chris Getz each hit a bases-loaded triple, allowing the Royals to rally and beat the Philadelphia Phillies 13–4, spoiling the Phillies' home opener with a sellout crowd of 45,307 at Citizens Bank Park. The interleague matchup was a rare one between teams who first met in the 1980 World Series. The only other visit to Philadelphia by the Royals came in 2004. After getting a total of 17 hits in their first three games against the Chicago White Sox, the Royals had 19 against the Phillies. Hall of Famers Mike Schmidt and George Brett, rivals when the Phillies beat the Royals to win their first championship 33 years earlier, threw out the first pitches (along with SNLs Joe Piscopo). Wade Davis, acquired from Tampa Bay Rays along with James Shields, made his first start since 2011. He made 54 relief appearances for the Rays in 2012 after 58 starts from 2010-11.

The Royals didn't commit an error in their first seven games (64 2/3 innings) for the first time in team history. As of April 10, the Royals had won four straight games and six of seven games to move three games above .500 for the first time since May 12, 2011, when they were 20–17. The Royals went on to sweep the Minnesota Twins at home at Kauffman Stadium. However, on April 12 (after a day off), the Royals lost against the Toronto Blue Jays after committing three errors within the game, matching their season total at that time.

Royals 1B Eric Hosmer had tightness in his right quadriceps and did not start for the second straight night on April 13. Nonetheless, as a result of Alex Gordon driving in a run, the Royals avoided a three-game sweep by the Blue Jays, who had won six straight and eight of 10 against the Royals at Kauffman Stadium, including a four-game sweep in their only series in Kansas City from the previous season. Therefore, the Royals maintained first place in the ALC, but were tied with the Detroit Tigers after they defeated the Oakland Athletics.

Impact of the Boston Marathon bombing
Although performing well, the Royals helped the Atlanta Braves win their 10th straight game with a 6–3 victory over KC on April 16. After both teams had a day off, players, managers and coaches for both teams wore No. 42 on their jerseys to honor Jackie Robinson. Like many teams, the Braves also held a moment of silence before the game for the victims of the Boston Marathon bombing (April 15). Chris Getz, KC's No. 8 hitter, homered for the first time in nearly four years (on July 19, 2009 when he played for the Chicago White Sox). Jeff Francoeur, a former Braves RF, played his first game at Turner Field with Kansas City. With Wade Davis pitching 7 scoreless innings, the Royals beat the Braves 1–0 on April 17 to end Atlanta's 10-game winning streak.

The Royals had a scheduled weekend series against the Boston Red Sox between  April 19–21. It was to be Boston's first home game since the bombings, the explosions occurring 45 minutes after they finished playing the Rays on April 15 while en route to play the Cleveland Indians. However, the Greater Boston area went on a citywide lockdown in search of a suspect on the morning of April 19. Therefore, their first "homecoming game" of the weekend was postponed. The Red Sox reported the decision was made "to support efforts of law enforcement officers." The Royals stayed at the Westin Copley Place Hotel near Copley Square, about a block from the marathon finish line. "We've been told not to go outside. We've been told the hotel has been locked down, although I've seen a handful of people moving around", Royals vice president Mike Swanson said. "The streets are just, wow. It's numbingly quiet for a noon hour in Boston." No make-up game was immediately scheduled.

However, with the second suspect captured that same evening and Fenway Park under tight security, play resumed Saturday, April 20, with a win of 4–3 by Boston over the Royals. Following an emotional pregame ceremony, both teams honored the victims of the bombing tragedy by wearing special uniforms/logos. (The Red Sox wore white home jerseys with "Boston" on the front instead of the customary "Red Sox" while Kansas City players and staff wore a "B Strong" patch on the front of their jerseys, with the shirts being auctioned off for funds to support victims of the bombing.)  The Red Sox later announced Friday's (April, 19) game would be made up as part of a day-night doubleheader on Sunday (April, 21). The regularly scheduled game took place at 1:35 p.m., and a nightcap at 7 p.m. Even with the loss, the Royals moved to first place since the Detroit Tigers also lost in the American League Central.

On April 21, Kansas City ended Boston's seven-game winning streak with a 4–2 win over the Red Sox in the opener of a day-night doubleheader. With tributes to the victims of the Boston Marathon bombings still visibly clear, the Royals ended a season-opening streak of 16 games by Red Sox starters allowing three runs or less, tying an AL record achieved by the Oakland Athletics in 1978 and 1981. With the Detroit Tigers losing, the win kept the Royals secure in first place. In the second game of the doubleheader, Kansas City narrowly beat Boston 5–4 in 10 innings to win the weekend series (and sweep the doubleheader), as a result of Lorenzo Cain walking with two outs and the bases loaded in the 10th inning. With both wins against the Red Sox on April 21, Kansas City remained in first place in the AL Central as did Boston in the AL East. A disappointing ending to an emotional weekend for the Red Sox, Ervin Santana (2-1) pitched seven strong innings, Kelvin Herrera (2–2) got the win and Greg Holland pitched a perfect ninth for his fourth save in five opportunities. Billy Butler homered in the eighth inning of the night game (clearing the Green Monster). The Royals also recalled LHP Will Smith from Triple-A Omaha.

Remaining in first place
On April 25, Alex Gordon's grand slam (clearing the 420-foot marker on the wall in center field) highlighted a five-run 10th inning for Kansas City, who rallied against the Detroit Tigers bullpen for an 8–3 win, keeping the Royals in first place (ALC). Billy Butler had three hits on the day and improved to 23 for 55 (.418) off Justin Verlander, the best mark of anyone with at least 30 at-bats against the Detroit pitcher. Tim Collins (1–0) pitched a scoreless ninth for the Royals and got the win. This followed a game the previous day, which the Royals narrowly lost against Detroit (having only played two out of six days due to postponed games and having no batting practice prior to the game on April 24 as a result of bad weather). Overall, the Royals went 4–3 at Atlanta, Boston and Detroit. Kansas City did not play a home game since April 14. They played seven road games in 11 days. "This was a phenomenal road trip for us", said right-hander James Shields, who pitched eight solid innings on April 25. "We're going to look back at this road trip, and I think it's going to be a pretty crucial road trip."

On April 28, in the opener of a doubleheader caused by a rainout two days earlier, Jeremy Guthrie (3–0) allowed six hits over 6 2/3 innings for his 16th consecutive start without a loss. That matched the Kansas City record set by Paul Splittorff from August 13, 1977 – April 22, 1978. The Royals went on to beat the Indians 9–0, with a memorable 500th career hit from Alcides Escobar being a home run (370 feet) and a right center home run by Alex Gordon (438 feet), 

May
After spending most of April in first place (AL Central), the Royals ended the month with a 14–10 record (7–4 at home), a half game behind the Detroit Tigers as of April 30 (an improvement from their 6–15 mark going into May a year ago). However, on May 1, the Royals moved back into first place (15–10), due to the Tigers losing to the Minnesota Twins and then the Royals later beating the Tampa Bay Rays (giving them a .600 percentage). Unfortunately, it was not to last, as the Royals would go 8-20 for the month, their worst May record since 2006 (8-21).

Season standings

American League Central

American League Wild Card

Record vs. opponents

Detailed records

   

Game log

|- bgcolor="ffbbbb"
| 1 || April 1 || @ White Sox || 3:10 || 0-1 || Chris Sale (1-0) || James Shields (0-1) || Addison Reed (1) || 39,012 || 0-1 
|- bgcolor="ffbbbb"
| 2 || April 3 || @ White Sox || 3:10 || 2-5 || Jake Peavy (1-0) || Ervin Santana (0-1) || Addison Reed (2) || 14,213 || 0-2
|- bgcolor="bbffbb"
| 3 || April 4 || @ White Sox || 3:10 || 3-1 || Jeremy Guthrie (1-0) || Gavin Floyd (0-1) || Greg Holland (1) || 15,036 || 1-2
|- bgcolor="bbffbb"
| 4 || April 5 || @ Phillies || 3:05 || 13-4 || Bruce Chen (1-0) || Kyle Kendrick(0-1) ||  || 45,307 || 2-2
|- bgcolor="ffbbbb"
| 5 || April 6 || @ Phillies || 6:05 || 3-4 || Antonio Bastardo (1-0) || Greg Holland (0-1) ||  || 39,475 || 2-3
|- bgcolor="bbffbb"
| 6 || April 7 || @ Phillies || 12:35 || 9-8 || James Shields (1-1) || Cole Hamels (0-2) || Kelvin Herrera (1) || 39,451 || 3-3
|- bgcolor="bbffbb"
| 7 || April 8 || Twins || 3:10 || 3-1  || Ervin Santana (1-1)  || Kevin Correia (0-1)  || Aaron Crow (1)  || 40,073 || 4-3 
|- bgcolor="bbffbb"
| 8 || April 9 || Twins || 7:10 || 7-4  || Jeremy Guthrie (2-0)  || Mike Pelfrey (1-1) || Greg Holland (2) || 11,697 || 5-3 
|- bgcolor="bbffbb"
| 9 || April 10 || Twins || 7:10 || 3-0 || Wade Davis (1-0) || Liam Hendriks (0-1) || Kelvin Herrera (2) || 10,069 || 6-3  
|- bgcolor="ffbbbb"
| 10 || April 12 || Blue Jays || 7:10 || 4-8 || J. A. Happ (2-0) || Luis Mendoza (0-1) || Aaron Loup (1) || 13,049 || 6-4   
|- bgcolor="ffbbbb"
| 11 || April 13 || Blue Jays || 6:10 || 2-3 || R. A. Dickey (1-2) || James Shields (1-2) || Casey Janssen (3) || 21,960 || 6-5
|- bgcolor="bbffbb"
| 12 || April 14 || Blue Jays || 1:10 || 3-2 || Kelvin Herrera (1-0) || Darren Oliver (0-1) ||  || 29,057 || 7-5
|- bgcolor="ffbbbb"
| 13 || April 16 || @ Braves || 6:10 || 3-6 || Eric O'Flaherty (3-0) || Kelvin Herrera (1-1) ||  || 26,400 || 7-6
|- bgcolor="bbffbb"
| 14 || April 17 || @ Braves || 11:10 || 1-0 || Wade Davis (2-0) || Mike Minor (2-1) || Greg Holland (3) || 23,018 || 8-6
|- bgcolor="bbbbbb"
| – || April 19 || @ Red Sox ||colspan="8" | Postponed (lockdown in Boston due to manhunt for Boston Marathon bombing suspect) (Makeup date: doubleheader April 21) 
|- bgcolor="ffbbbb"
| 15 || April 20 || @ Red Sox || 12:10 || 3-4 || Clay Buchholz (4-0)  || Kelvin Herrera (1-2) || Andrew Bailey (3) || 35,152 || 8-7
|- bgcolor="bbffbb"
| 16 || April 21 || @ Red Sox || 1:35 || 4-2 || Ervin Santana (2-1) || Ryan Dempster (0-2) || Greg Holland (4) || 31,483 || 9-7
|- bgcolor="bbffbb"
| 17 || April 21 || @ Red Sox || 7:05 || 5-4 || Kelvin Herrera (2-2) || Andrew Miller (0-1) || Greg Holland (5) || 33,270 || 10-7
|- bgcolor="bbbbbb"
| – || April 23 || @ Tigers || colspan="8" | Postponed (rain) (Makeup date: doubleheader August 16)
|- bgcolor="ffbbbb"
| 18 || April 24 || @ Tigers || 6:05 || 5-7 || Max Scherzer (2-0) || Wade Davis (2-1) || José Valverde (1) || 30,347 || 10-8
|- bgcolor="bbffbb"
| 19 || April 25 || @ Tigers || 12:05 || 8-3 (10) || Tim Collins (1-0) || Phil Coke (0-3) ||  || 30,321 || 11-8 
|- bgcolor="bbbbbb"
| – || April 26 || Indians || colspan="8" |Postponed (rain) (Makeup date: doubleheader April 28)
|- bgcolor="bbffbb"
| 20 || April 27 || Indians || 6:10 || 3-2 || Ervin Santana (3-1) || Scott Kazmir (0-1) || Greg Holland (6) ||  19,224|| 12-8
|- bgcolor="bbffbb"
| 21 || April 28 || Indians || 1:10 || 9-0 || Jeremy Guthrie (3-0) || Justin Masterson (4-2) ||  || 22,001 || 13-8
|- bgcolor="ffbbbb"
| 22 || April 28 || Indians || 7:10 || 3-10 || Corey Kluber (2-0) || Will Smith (0-1) || || 19,831 ||13-9
|- bgcolor="ffbbbb"
| 23 || April 29 || Indians || 7:10 || 0-9 || Ubaldo Jiménez (1-2) || Wade Davis (2-2) ||  || 14,255 || 13-10
|- bgcolor="bbffbb"
| 24 || April 30 || Rays || 7:10 || 8-2 || James Shields (2-2) || Alex Cobb (3-2) ||  || 12,738 || 14-10
|-

|- bgcolor="bbffbb"
| 25 || May 1 || Rays || 7:10 || 9-8 || Bruce Chen (2-0) || Jake McGee (0-2) || Greg Holland (7) || 11,514 || 15-10
|- bgcolor="bbbbbb"
| – || May 2 || Rays || colspan="7" | Postponed after 3 1/2 innings (rain) (Makeup date: August 26)
|- bgcolor="bbbbbb"
| – || May 3 || White Sox || colspan="7" | Postponed (rain) (Makeup date: May 6)
|- bgcolor="bbffbb"
| 26 || May 4 || White Sox || 6:10 || 2-0 || Jeremy Guthrie (4-0) || Dylan Axelrod (0-2) ||  || 19,957 || 16-10
|- bgcolor="bbffbb"
| 27 || May 5 || White Sox || 1:10 || 6-5 (10) || Greg Holland (1-1) || Brian Omogrosso (0-1) ||  || 16,462 || 17-10
|- bgcolor="ffbbbb"
| 28 || May 6 || White Sox || 1:10 || 1-2 (11)|| Jesse Crain (1-1) || Kelvin Herrera (2-3) || Addison Reed (11) || 15,576 || 17-11
|- bgcolor="ffbbbb"
| 29 || May 7 || @ Orioles || 6:05 || 3-4 || Tommy Hunter (2-1) || Tim Collins (1-1) || Jim Johnson (12) || 12,921 || 17-12
|- bgcolor="ffbbbb"
| 30 || May 8 || @ Orioles || 6:05 || 3-5 || Chris Tillman (3-1) || Luis Mendoza (0-2) || Jim Johnson (13) || 12,344 || 17-13
|- bgcolor="bbffbb"
| 31 || May 9 || @ Orioles || 6:05 || 6-2 || Jeremy Guthrie (5-0) || Freddy García (0-1) ||  || 23,282 || 18-13
|- bgcolor="ffbbbb"
| 32 || May 10 || Yankees || 7:10 || 6-11 || Phil Hughes (2-2) || Wade Davis (2-3) ||  || 24,521 || 18-14 
|- bgcolor="ffbbbb"
| 33 || May 11 || Yankees || 6:10 || 2-3 || Andy Pettitte (4-2) || James Shields (2-3) || Mariano Rivera (14) || 30,910 || 18-15
|- bgcolor="ffbbbb"
| 34 || May 12 || Yankees || 1:10 || 2-4 || Hiroki Kuroda (5-2) || Ervin Santana (3-2) || Mariano Rivera (15) || 29,515 || 18-16 
|- bgcolor="bbffbb"
| 35 || May 13 || @ Angels || 9:05 || 11-4 || Luis Mendoza (1-2) || Joe Blanton (0-7) || Luke Hochevar (1) || 32,203 || 19-16
|- bgcolor="ffbbbb"
| 36 || May 14 || @ Angels || 9:05 || 2-6 || Jason Vargas (2-3) || Jeremy Guthrie (5-1) ||  || 33,028 || 19-17
|- bgcolor="bbffbb"
| 37 || May 15 || @ Angels || 9:05 || 9-5 || Wade Davis (3-3) || Barry Enright (0-2) ||  || 31,917 || 20-17
|- bgcolor="ffbbbb"
| 38 || May 17 || @ Athletics || 9:07 || 1-2 || Sean Doolittle (3-0) || James Shields (2-4) || Grant Balfour (7) || 14,602 || 20-18
|- bgcolor="ffbbbb"
| 39 || May 18 || @ Athletics || 8:07 || 1-2 || Tommy Milone (4-5)  || Ervin Santana (3-3) || Grant Balfour (8) || 35,067 || 20-19
|- bgcolor="ffbbbb"
| 40 || May 19 || @ Athletics || 3:07 || 3-4 || Jerry Blevins (3-0) || Kelvin Herrera (2-4) || Ryan Cook (1) || 20,387 || 20-20 
|- bgcolor="ffbbbb"
| 41 || May 20 || @ Astros || 7:10 || 5-6 || Dallas Keuchel (1-1) || Jeremy Guthrie (5-2) || José Veras (7) || 12,989 || 20-21
|- bgcolor="bbffbb"
| 42 || May 21 || @ Astros || 7:10 || 7-3 || Bruce Chen (3-0) || Paul Clemens (1-2) ||  || 12,302 || 21-21
|- bgcolor="ffbbbb"
| 43 || May 22 || @ Astros || 7:10 || 1-3 || Jordan Lyles (2-1) || James Shields (2-5) || José Veras (8) || 12,324 || 21-22
|- bgcolor="ffbbbb"
| 44 || May 23 || Angels || 7:10 || 4-5 || Joe Blanton (1-7) || Ervin Santana (3-4) || Robert Coello (1) || 18,784 || 21-23 
|- bgcolor="ffbbbb"
| 45 || May 24 || Angels || 7:10 || 2-5 || Jason Vargas (4-3) || Luke Hochevar (0-1) || Garrett Richards (1) || 32,148 ||21-24 
|- bgcolor="ffbbbb"
| 46 || May 25 || Angels || 1:10 || 0-7 || Billy Buckner (1-0) || Jeremy Guthrie (5-3) ||  || 27,958 || 21-25
|- bgcolor="ffbbbb"
| 47 || May 26 || Angels || 1:10 || 2-5 || Jerome Williams (4-1) || Wade Davis (3-4) || Ernesto Frieri (10) || 24,475 || 21-26 
|- bgcolor="ffbbbb"
| 48 || May 27 || Cardinals || 1:10 || 3-6 || Adam Wainwright (7-3) || James Shields (2-6) || Edward Mujica (15) || 34,746 || 21-27
|- bgcolor="ffbbbb"
| 49 || May 28 || Cardinals || 7:10 || 1-4 || Tyler Lyons (2-0) || Ervin Santana (3-5) || Edward Mujica (16) || 27,833 || 21-28
|- bgcolor="ffbbbb"
| 50 || May 29 || @ Cardinals || 7:15 || 3-5 || Randy Choate (1-0) || Aaron Crow (0-1) || Edward Mujica (17) || 43,477 ||21-29 
|- bgcolor="bbffbb"
| 51 || May 30 || @ Cardinals || 7:15 || 4-2 || Louis Coleman (1-0) || Mitchell Boggs (0-3) || Greg Holland (8) || 43,916 ||22-29  
|- bgcolor="ffbbbb"
| 52 || May 31 || @ Rangers || 7:05 || 2-7 || Derek Holland (5-2) || Wade Davis (3-5) ||  || 37,765 ||22-30 
|-

|- bgcolor="bbffbb"
| 53 || June 1 || @ Rangers || 3:05 || 4-1 (10) || Aaron Crow (1-1) || Robbie Ross (2-1) ||  Greg Holland (9)|| 36,107 ||23-30
|- bgcolor="ffbbbb"
| 54 || June 2 || @ Rangers || 2:05 || 1-3 || Tanner Scheppers (4-0) || JC Gutierrez (0-1) || Joe Nathan (17) || 47,567 ||23-31
|- bgcolor="ffbbbb"
| 55 || June 4 || Twins || 7:10 || 0-3 || Samuel Deduno (2-1) || Luis Mendoza (1-3) || Glen Perkins (12) || 20,134 ||23-32
|- bgcolor="bbffbb"
| 56 || June 5 || Twins || 7:10 || 4-1 || Jeremy Guthrie (6-3) || P. J. Walters (2-1) || Greg Holland (10) || 12,407 ||24-32
|- bgcolor="bbffbb"
| 57 || June 6 || Twins || 7:10 || 7-3 || Tim Collins (2-1) || Jared Burton (0-3) ||  || 14,942 || 25-32
|- bgcolor="bbffbb"
| 58 || June 7 || Astros || 7:10 || 4-2 || Kelvin Herrera (3-4) || Wesley Wright (0-2) || Greg Holland (11) || 24,808 ||26-32
|- bgcolor="bbffbb"
| 59 || June 8 || Astros || 6:15 || 7-2 || Ervin Santana (4-5) || Érik Bédard (1-3) ||  || 28,055 ||27-32
|- bgcolor="bbffbb"
| 60 || June 9 || Astros || 1:10 || 2-0 || Aaron Crow (2-1) || Héctor Ambriz (1-3) || Greg Holland (12) || 20,723 ||28-32
|- bgcolor="bbffbb"
| 61 || June 10 || Tigers || 7:10 || 3-2 || Jeremy Guthrie (7-3) || Doug Fister (5-4) || Greg Holland (13) || 17,653 ||29-32
|- bgcolor="ffbbbb"
| 62 || June 11 || Tigers || 7:10 || 2-3 || Max Scherzer (9-0) || Aaron Crow (2-2) || José Valverde (9) || 16,493 ||29-33
|- bgcolor="bbffbb"
| 63 || June 12 || Tigers || 1:10 || 3-2 (10) || Greg Holland (2-1) || Phil Coke (0-4) ||  || 24,564 ||30-33
|- bgcolor="bbffbb"
| 64 || June 13 || @ Rays || 6:10 || 10-1 || Ervin Santana (5-5) || Jeremy Hellickson (4-3) ||  || 11,398 ||31-33
|- bgcolor="bbffbb"
| 65 || June 14 || @ Rays || 6:10 || 7-2 || Luis Mendoza (2-3) || Matt Moore (8-3) ||  ||  13,407 || 32-33
|- bgcolor="ffbbbb"
| 66 || June 15 || @ Rays || 3:10 || 3-5 || Alex Torres (2-0) || Jeremy Guthrie(7-4) || Fernando Rodney (14) || 18,593 ||32-34
|- bgcolor="bbffbb"
| 67 || June 16 || @ Rays || 12:40 || 5-3 || Wade Davis (4-5) || Roberto Hernández (4-7) || Greg Holland (14) || 27,442 ||33-34
|- bgcolor="bbffbb"
| 68 || June 17 || @ Indians || 6:10 || 2-1 || Aaron Crow (3-2) || Bryan Shaw (0-1) || Greg Holland (15) || 12,803 ||34-34
|- bgcolor="ffbbbb"
| 69 || June 18 || @ Indians || 6:10 || 3-4 || Cody Allen (2-0) || Kelvin Herrera (3-5) || Vinnie Pestano (2) || 14,853 ||34-35
|- bgcolor="ffbbbb"
| 70 || June 19 || @ Indians || 6:10 || 3-6 || Justin Masterson (9-5) ||Luis Mendoza (2-4)  ||  || 17,349 ||34-36
|- bgcolor="ffbbbb"
| 71 || June 21 || White Sox || 7:10 || 1-9 || Hector Santiago (3-5) || Jeremy Guthrie (7-5) ||  || 33,830 ||34-37
|- bgcolor="ffbbbb"
| 72 || June 22 || White Sox || 1:10 || 2-3 || Jesse Crain (2-1) || Aaron Crow (3-3) || Addison Reed (21) || 20,364 ||34-38
|- bgcolor="bbffbb"
| 73 || June 23 || White Sox || 1:10 || 7-6 || Luke Hochevar (1-1) || Jesse Crain (2-2) || Greg Holland (16) || 18,622 ||35-38
|- bgcolor="ffbbbb"
| 74 || June 25 || Braves || 7:10 || 3-4 || Kris Medlen (5-7) || Tim Collins (2-2) || Craig Kimbrel (22) || 29,947 ||35-39
|- bgcolor="bbffbb"
| 75 || June 26 || Braves || 7:10 || 4-3 (10) || Aaron Crow (4-3) || Alex Wood (0-2) ||  || 22,207 ||36-39
|- bgcolor="ffbbbb"
| 76 || June 27 || @ Twins || 7:10 || 1-3 || Samuel Deduno (4-2) || Jeremy Guthrie (7-6) || Glen Perkins (20) || 28,040 || 36-40
|- bgcolor="bbffbb"
| 77 || June 28 || @ Twins || 7:10 || 9-3 || James Shields (3-6) || PJ Walters (2-4) ||  || 28,916 || 37-40
|- bgcolor="ffbbbb"
| 78 || June 29 || @ Twins || 3:10 || 2-6 || Kyle Gibson (1-0) || Wade Davis (4-6) ||  || 36,881 || 37-41
|- bgcolor="bbffbb"
| 79 || June 30 || @ Twins || 1:10 || 9-8 || Aaron Crow (5-3) || Jared Burton (1-5) || Greg Holland (17) || 34,232 ||38-41
|-

|- bgcolor="ffbbbb"
| 80 || July 2 || Indians || 7:10 || 5-6 || Cody Allen (3-0) || Tim Collins (2-3) || Chris Perez (8) || 15,625 ||38-42
|- bgcolor="bbffbb"
| 81 || July 3 || Indians || 7:10 || 6-5 || Will Smith (1-1) || Cody Allen (3-1) || Greg Holland (18) || 28,534 || 39-42
|- bgcolor="bbffbb"
| 82 || July 4 || Indians || 1:10 || 10-7 || Luke Hochevar (2-1) || Bryan Shaw (0-2) || Greg Holland (19) || 16,792 || 40-42
|- bgcolor="ffbbbb"
| 83 || July 5 || Athletics || 7:10 || 3-6 || Tommy Milone (8-7) || Wade Davis (4-7) || Grant Balfour (22) || 35,518 || 40-43
|- bgcolor="bbffbb"
| 84 || July 6 || Athletics || 1:10 || 4-3 || Aaron Crow (6-3) || Ryan Cook (1-2) || Greg Holland (20) || 16,606 || 41-43
|- bgcolor="ffbbbb"
| 85 || July 7 || Athletics || 1:10 || 4-10 || A. J. Griffin (7-6) || Luis Mendoza (2-5) || Jesse Chavez (1) || 17,804 ||41-44
|- bgcolor="bbffbb"
| 86 || July 8 || @ Yankees || 6:10 || 5-1 || Jeremy Guthrie (8-6) || Phil Hughes (4-8) || Greg Holland (21) || 35,057 || 42-44
|- bgcolor="bbffbb"
| 87 || July 9 || @ Yankees || 6:10 || 3-1 ||  James Shields (4-6)|| CC Sabathia (9-7)|| Greg Holland (22) || 35,797 || 43-44
|- bgcolor="ffbbbb"
| 88 || July 10 || @ Yankees || 6:10 || 1-8 || Iván Nova (4-2) || Wade Davis (4-8) ||  || 35,781 || 43-45
|- bgcolor="ffbbbb"
| 89 || July 11 || @ Yankees || 12:10 || 4-8 || Andy Pettitte (7-6) || Ervin Santana (5-6) ||  || 40,381 || 43-46
|- bgcolor="ffbbbb"
| 90 || July 12 || @ Indians || 6:05 || 0-3 || Corey Kluber (7-5) || Tim Collins (2-4) || Cody Allen (2) || 24,077 ||43-47
|- bgcolor="ffbbbb"
| 91 || July 13 || @ Indians || 6:05 || 3-5 || Scott Kazmir (5-4) || Jeremy Guthrie (8-7) || Chris Perez (12) || 29,740 ||43-48
|- bgcolor="ffbbbb"
| 92 || July 14 || @ Indians || 12:05 || 4-6 || Rich Hill (1-1) || Tim Collins (2-5) || Chris Perez (13) || 15,432 || 43-49
|- bgcolor="bbffbb"
| 93 || July 19 || Tigers || 7:10 || 1-0 || Ervin Santana (6-6) || Aníbal Sánchez (7-7) || Greg Holland (23) || 35,000 ||44-49
|- bgcolor="bbffbb"
| 94 || July 20 || Tigers || 6:10 || 6-5 || Jeremy Guthrie (9-7) || Justin Verlander (10-7) || Greg Holland (24) || 30,116 ||45-49
|- bgcolor="ffbbbb"
| 95 || July 21 || Tigers || 1:10 || 1-4 || Doug Fister (8-5) || James Shields (4-7) || Joaquín Benoit (9) || 20,513 ||45-50
|- bgcolor="ffbbbb"
| 96 || July 22 || Orioles || 7:10 || 2-9 || Scott Feldman (9-7) || Wade Davis (4-9) ||  || 16,362 ||45-51
|- bgcolor="bbffbb"
| 97 || July 23 || Orioles || 7:10 || 3-2 || Bruce Chen (4-0) || Jason Hammel (7-7) || Greg Holland (25) || 19,072 ||46-51
|- bgcolor="bbffbb"
| 98 || July 24 || Orioles || 7:10 || 4-3 || Luke Hochevar (3-1) || Darren O'Day (5-1) ||  || 17,410 ||47-51
|- bgcolor="bbffbb"
| 99 || July 25 || Orioles || 7:10 || 7-1 || Jeremy Guthrie (10-7) || Miguel González (8-4) ||  || 17,675 ||48-51
|- bgcolor="bbffbb"
| 100 || July 26 || @ White Sox || 7:10 || 5-1 || James Shields (5-7) || José Quintana (5-3) ||  || 18,342 ||49-51
|- bgcolor="bbffbb"
| 101 || July 27 || @ White Sox || 6:10 || 1-0 || Wade Davis (5-9) || Chris Sale (6-10) || Greg Holland (26) || 26,172 ||50-51
|- bgcolor="bbffbb"
| 102 || July 28 || @ White Sox || 1:10 || 4-2 (12) || Aaron Crow (7-3) || Donnie Veal (1-1) || Greg Holland (27) || 24,079 ||51-51
|- bgcolor="bbffbb"
| 103 || July 30 || @ Twins || 7:10 || 7-2 || Ervin Santana (7-6) || Mike Pelfrey (4-9) ||  || 33,085 ||52-51
|- bgcolor="bbffbb"
| 104 || July 31 || @ Twins || 7:10 || 4-3 || Jeremy Guthrie (11-7) || Caleb Thielbar (1-1) || Greg Holland (28) || 32,789 ||53-51
|-

|- bgcolor="bbffbb"
| 105 || August 1 || @ Twins || 12:10 || 7-2 || James Shields (6-7) || Scott Diamond (5-10) ||  || 35,448 ||54-51 
|- bgcolor="ffbbbb"
| 106 || August 2 || @ Mets || 6:10 || 2-4 (11) || Carlos Torres (2-2) || Luis Mendoza (2-6) ||  || 31,032 ||54-52
|- bgcolor="bbffbb"
| 107 || August 3 || @ Mets || 12:10 || 4-3 (12) || Kelvin Herrera (4-5) || David Aardsma (2-1) || Greg Holland (29) || 25,095 ||55-52
|- bgcolor="bbffbb"
| 108 || August 4 || @ Mets || 12:10 || 6-2 || Ervin Santana (8-6) || Zack Wheeler (4-2) ||  || 25,658 ||56-52
|- bgcolor="bbffbb"
| 109 || August 5 || Twins || 7:10 || 13-0 || Jeremy Guthrie (12-7) || Kevin Correia (7-8) ||  || 21,474 ||57-52
|- bgcolor="ffbbbb"
| 110 || August 6 || Twins || 7:10 || 0-7 || Andrew Albers (1-0) || James Shields (6-8) ||  || 18,924 ||57-53
|- bgcolor="bbffbb"
| 111 || August 7 || Twins || 7:10 || 5-2 || Louis Coleman (2-0) || Samuel Deduno (7-5) || Greg Holland (30) || 20,198 ||58-53
|- bgcolor="bbffbb"
| 112 || August 8 || Red Sox || 7:10 || 5-1 || Bruce Chen (5-0) || Jon Lester (10-7) || Luke Hochevar (2) || 21,121 ||59-53
|- bgcolor="bbffbb"
| 113 || August 9 || Red Sox || 7:10 || 9-6 || Francisley Bueno (1-0) || Drake Britton (1-1) || Greg Holland (31) || 29,485 ||60-53
|- bgcolor="ffbbbb"
| 114 || August 10 || Red Sox || 6:10 || 3-5 || Brandon Workman (3-1) || Jeremy Guthrie (12-8) || Koji Uehara (12) || 38,742 ||60-54
|- bgcolor="bbffbb"
| 115 || August 11 || Red Sox || 1:10 || 4-3 || James Shields (7-8) || John Lackey (7-10) || Greg Holland (32) || 24,935 ||61-54
|- bgcolor="bbffbb"
| 116 || August 12 || Marlins || 7:10 || 6-2 || Wade Davis (6-9) || Tom Koehler (3-8) ||  || 15,956 ||62-54
|- bgcolor="ffbbbb"
| 117 || August 13 || Marlins || 7:10 || 0-1 (10) || Chad Qualls (3-1) || Kelvin Herrera (4-6) || Steve Cishek (25) || 21,094 ||62-55
|- bgcolor="ffbbbb"
| 118 || August 14 || Marlins || 1:10 || 2-5 || Dan Jennings (2-3) || Tim Collins (2-6) || Steve Cishek (26) || 17,760 ||62-56
|- bgcolor="ffbbbb"
| 119 || August 15 || @ Tigers || 6:05 || 1-4 || Aníbal Sánchez (11-7) || Jeremy Guthrie (12-9) || Joaquín Benoit (16) || 37,872 ||62-57
|- bgcolor="bbffbb"
| 120 || August 16 || @ Tigers || 12:05 || 2-1 || Danny Duffy (1-0) || Justin Verlander (12-9) || Greg Holland (33) || 38,714 ||63-57
|- bgcolor="bbffbb"
| 121 || August 16 || @ Tigers || 6:05 || 3-0 || James Shields (8-8) || José Álvarez (1-3) || Greg Holland (34) || 40,980 ||64-57
|- bgcolor="ffbbbb"
| 122 || August 17 || @ Tigers || 6:05 || 5-6 || Joaquín Benoit (3-0) || Aaron Crow (7-4) ||  || 41,850 ||64-58
|- bgcolor="ffbbbb"
| 123 || August 18 || @ Tigers || 12:05 || 3-6 || Max Scherzer (18-1) || Bruce Chen (5-1) ||  || 41,740 ||64-59
|- bgcolor="ffbbbb"
| 124 || August 20 || White Sox || 7:10 || 0-2 || John Danks (3-10) || Ervin Santana (8-7) || Addison Reed (32) || 13,060 ||64-60
|- bgcolor="ffbbbb"
| 125 || August 21 || White Sox || 7:10 || 2-5 || André Rienzo (1-0) || Jeremy Guthrie (12-10) || Addison Reed (33) || 13,083 ||64-61
|- bgcolor="ffbbbb"
| 126 || August 22 || White Sox || 7:10 || 3-4 (12) || Jake Petricka (1-0) || Luke Hochevar (3-2) || Addison Reed (34) || 13,363 ||64-62
|- bgcolor="ffbbbb"
| 127 || August 23 || Nationals || 7:10 || 10-11 || Tanner Roark (4-0) || Bruce Chen (5-2) || Rafael Soriano (33) || 28,733 ||64-63
|- bgcolor="ffbbbb"
| 128 || August 24 || Nationals || 6:10 || 2-7 || Jordan Zimmermann (15-7) || Wade Davis (6-10) ||  || 28,023 ||64-64
|- bgcolor="bbffbb"
| 129 || August 25 || Nationals || 1:10 || 6-4 || Kelvin Herrera (5-6) || Craig Stammen (7-6) || Greg Holland (35) || 19,661 ||65-64
|- bgcolor="bbffbb"
| 130 || August 26 || Rays || 1:10 || 11-1 || Jeremy Guthrie (13-10) || Jeremy Hellickson (10-8) ||  || 20,546 ||66-64
|- bgcolor="bbffbb"
| 131 || August 27 || @ Twins || 7:10 || 6-1 || James Shields (9-8) || Jared Burton (2-8) ||  || 27,006 ||67-64
|- bgcolor="bbffbb"
| 132 || August 28 || @ Twins || 7:10 || 8-1 || Danny Duffy (2-0) || Andrew Albers (2-2) ||  || 27,379 ||68-64
|- bgcolor="bbffbb"
| 133 || August 29 || @ Twins || 12:10 || 3-1 || Bruce Chen (6-2) || Samuel Deduno (8-8) || Greg Holland (36) || 28,012 ||69-64
|- bgcolor="ffbbbb"
| 134 || August 30 || @ Blue Jays || 6:07 || 2-3 || Mark Buehrle (11-7) || Ervin Santana (8-8) || Casey Janssen (25) || 21,031 ||69-65
|- bgcolor="ffbbbb"
| 135 || August 31 || @ Blue Jays || 12:07 || 2-4 || R. A. Dickey (11-12) || Kelvin Herrera (5-7) || Casey Janssen (26) || 34,315 ||69-66
|-

|- bgcolor="bbffbb"
| 136 || September 1 || @ Blue Jays || 12:07 || 5-0 || James Shields (10-8) || J. A. Happ (3-5) ||  || 22,961 ||70-66
|- bgcolor="bbffbb"
| 137 || September 2 || Mariners || 1:10 || 3-1 || Will Smith (2-1) || Félix Hernández (12-9) || Greg Holland (37) || 20,063 ||71-66
|- bgcolor="bbffbb"
| 138 || September 3 || Mariners || 7:10 || 4-3 || Luke Hochevar (4-2) || Yoervis Medina (4-4) || Greg Holland (38) || 13,638 ||72-66
|- bgcolor="ffbbbb"
| 139 || September 4 || Mariners || 7:10 || 4-6 || Lucas Luetge (1-2) || Aaron Crow (7-5) || Danny Farquhar (12) || 13,621 ||72-67
|- bgcolor="bbffbb"
| 140 || September 5 || Mariners || 1:10 || 7-6 (13) || Louis Coleman (3-0) || Chance Ruffin (0-1) ||  || 14,004 ||73-67
|- bgcolor="ffbbbb"
| 141 || September 6 || Tigers || 7:10 || 2-16 || Aníbal Sánchez (13-7) || James Shields (10-9) ||  || 21,358 ||73-68
|- bgcolor="bbffbb"
| 142 || September 7 || Tigers || 6:10 || 4-3 || Wade Davis (7-10) || Justin Verlander (12-11) || Greg Holland (39) || 20,402 ||74-68
|- bgcolor="bbffbb"
| 143 || September 8 || Tigers || 1:10 || 5-2 || Bruce Chen (7-2) || Doug Fister (12-8) || Greg Holland (40) || 16,774 ||75-68
|- bgcolor="ffbbbb"
| 144 || September 9 || @ Indians || 6:05 || 3-4 || Ubaldo Jiménez (11-9) || Ervin Santana (8-9) || Chris Perez (23) || 9,794 ||75-69
|- bgcolor="bbffbb"
| 145 || September 10 || @ Indians || 6:05 || 6-3 || Jeremy Guthrie (14-10) || Zach McAllister (7-9) || Greg Holland (41) || 12,615 ||76-69
|- bgcolor="bbffbb"
| 146 || September 11 || @ Indians || 11:05 || 6-2 || James Shields (11-9) || Scott Kazmir (8-8) || Greg Holland (42) || 12,085 ||77-69
|- bgcolor="ffbbbb"
| 147 || September 13 || @ Tigers || 6:05 || 3-6 || Justin Verlander (13-11) || Bruce Chen (7-3) || Joaquín Benoit (19) || 40,389 ||77-70
|- bgcolor="bbffbb"
| 148 || September 14 || @ Tigers || 6:05 || 1-0 || Ervin Santana (9-9) || Doug Fister (12-9) || Greg Holland (43) || 41,841 ||78-70
|- bgcolor="ffbbbb"
| 149 || September 15 || @ Tigers || 12:05 || 2-3 || Drew Smyly (6-0) || Jeremy Guthrie (14-11) || Joaquín Benoit (20) || 40,491 ||78-71
|- bgcolor="bbffbb"
| 150 || September 16 || Indians || 7:10 || 7-1 || James Shields (12-9) || Scott Kazmir (8-9) ||  || 15,413 ||79-71
|- bgcolor="ffbbbb"
| 151 || September 17 || Indians || 7:10 || 3-5 || Cody Allen (6-1) || Wade Davis (7-11) || Chris Perez (25) || 21,685 ||79-72
|- bgcolor="bbffbb"
| 152 || September 18 || Indians || 7:10 || 7-2 || Bruce Chen (8-3) || Danny Salazar (1-3) ||  || 21,198 ||80-72
|- bgcolor="bbffbb"
| 153 || September 20 || Rangers || 7:10 || 2-1 || Luke Hochevar (5-2) || Jason Frasor (4-3) || Greg Holland (44) || 21,837 ||81-72
|- bgcolor="ffbbbb"
| 154 || September 21 || Rangers || 6:10 || 1-3 || Matt Garza (10-6) || Jeremy Guthrie (14-12) || Joe Nathan (40) || 36,575 ||81-73
|- bgcolor="bbffbb"
| 155 || September 22 || Rangers || 1:10 || 4-0 (10) || Tim Collins (3-6) || Neal Cotts (5-3) ||  || 27,899 ||82-73
|- bgcolor="bbffbb"
| 156 || September 23 || @ Mariners || 9:10 || 6-5 (12) || Wade Davis (8-11) || Lucas Luetge (1-3) || Greg Holland (45) || 12,790 ||83-73
|- bgcolor="ffbbbb"
| 157 || September 24 || @ Mariners || 9:10 || 0-4 || James Paxton (3-0) || Bruce Chen (8-4) ||  || 12,528 ||83-74
|- bgcolor="ffbbbb"
| 158 || September 25 || @ Mariners || 9:10 || 0-6 || Hisashi Iwakuma (14-6) || Ervin Santana (9-10) ||  || 15,347 ||83-75
|- bgcolor="bbffbb"
| 159 || September 26 || @ White Sox || 7:10 || 3-2 || Jeremy Guthrie (15-12) || André Rienzo (2-3) || Greg Holland (46) || 16,434 ||84-75
|- bgcolor="bbffbb"
| 160 || September 27 || @ White Sox || 7:10 || 6-1 || James Shields (13-9) || Chris Sale (11-14) ||  || 24,474 ||85-75
|- bgcolor="ffbbbb"
| 161 || September 28 || @ White Sox || 6:10 || 5-6 || Erik Johnson (3-2) || Yordano Ventura (0-1) || Addison Reed (40) || 22,235 ||85-76
|- bgcolor="bbffbb"
| 162 || September 29 || @ White Sox || 1:10 || 4-1 || Bruce Chen (9-4) || José Quintana (9-7) || Greg Holland (47) || 22,633 ||86-76
|-

Roster

 Farm system 

LEAGUE CHAMPIONS: Omaha, Idaho Falls

ReferencesKansas City Royals:' Official web site

External links
2013 Kansas City Royals Official Site 
2013 Kansas City Royals at Baseball Reference

Kansas City Royals
Kansas City Royals seasons
2013 in sports in Missouri